Sir Gilbert Elliot, 2nd Baronet, (of Minto) (16 April 1766) was a Scottish lawyer, politician and judge from Minto in the Scottish Borders. From 1763 until his death 3 years later, he was Lord Justice Clerk, the second most senior judge in Scotland.

Early life
He was the oldest son of the judge Sir Gilbert Elliot, 1st Baronet, of Minto (–1718).  Elliot studied law at the University of Utrecht and was admitted to the Faculty of Advocates in 1715.

Career
He was the Member of Parliament (MP) for Roxburghshire from 1722 to 1726 He was also an eager agriculturist, and was one of the members of an Edinburgh "committee of taste for the improvement of the town." He was a keen supporter of the Hanoverian succession, in opposition to Jacobitism.

In June 1726 he was made a judge of the Court of Session, taking the judicial title Lord Minto. He became a Lord of Justiciary in 1733 and in 1761 Keeper of the Signet. In 1763 he was promoted to Lord Justice Clerk.

Personal life
In 1718, Elliot was married to Helen Stewart, the daughter of Sir Robert Steuart, 1st Baronet, who had been a member of the pre-union Parliament of Scotland. Together they were the parents of :

 Eleanor Elliot (1719–1797), who married John Rutherfurd in 1737.
 Sir Gilbert Elliot, 3rd Baronet (1722–1777), who married Agnes Dalrymple-Murray-Kynynmound, a daughter of Hugh Dalrymple-Murray-Kynynmound.
 Jean Elliot (1727–1805), a poet who never married.
 Andrew Elliot (1728–1797), a trader in British North America who served as acting colonial governor of the Province of New York in 1783; he married twice: Eleanor McCall in 1754; and after her death in 1756, to Elisabeth Plumsted, daughter of William Plumsted, in 1760.
 John Elliot (1732–1808), an admiral in the Royal Navy who never married.

Sir Gilbert died on 16 April 1766 and was survived by nine children.

Descendants
Through his eldest daughter Eleanor, he was a grandfather to John Rutherfurd, MP for Roxburghshire (who married Mary Ann Leslie, the only child of Maj.-Gen. Alexander Leslie), Elizabeth Rutherfurd (who married Andrew St Clair of Herdmanston, de jure 12th Lord Sinclair, parents of Charles St Clair, 13th Lord Sinclair) and Jane Rutherfurd (who married William Oliver of Dinlabyre).

Through his son Andrew, he was a grandfather of Eleanor Elliot (–1830), who married James Jauncey Jr. and Admiral Robert Digby, Agnes Murray Elliot (1763–1860), who married Sir David Carnegie, 4th Baronet, and
Elizabeth Elliot (–1847), who married William Cathcart, 1st Earl Cathcart.

References 
 

1693 births
Year of birth uncertain
1766 deaths
Members of the Parliament of Great Britain for Scottish constituencies
British MPs 1722–1727
Utrecht University alumni
Baronets in the Baronetage of Nova Scotia
Lords Justice Clerk
People from the Scottish Borders
Minto 2
Members of the Faculty of Advocates